Jesús Alvarado Nieves ( October 7, 1959 – April 28, 2017) was a Mexican luchador, or professional wrestler, who worked under the ring name Brazo de Oro ( Spanish for "Golden Arm"). He was a part of the Alvarado wrestling family, the son of Shadito Cruz and brother of Brazo de Plata, El Brazo, Brazo Cibernético, Super Brazo and Brazo de Platino. His son Felipe de Jesús Alvarado Mendoza currently works as La Máscara for Consejo Mundial de Lucha Libre. His nephews, Máximo Sexy and Psycho Clown are featured wrestlers for CMLL and Lucha Libre AAA Worldwide respectively.

Alvarado made his debut in 1975 and for over a decade wrestled under a wrestling mask, until he and his brothers Brazo de Plata and El Brazo lost a Lucha de Apuestas match to Los Villanos in 1988 and was forced to unmask. Over the years he has teamed with his brothers to win various championships such as the CMLL World Trios Championship, Mexican National Tag Team Championship, Mexican National Trios Championship, NWA Americas Tag Team Championship, NWA World Tag Team Championship (Los Angeles version), UWA World Tag Team Championship, UWA World Trios Championship, WWA World Tag Team Championship and WWA World Trios Championship. He started focusing more on behind the scenes activities in the early 1990s, where he worked as one of the bookers for CMLL and served as the head of the wrestlers' union for many years.

Early life
Jesús Alvarado Nieves was born on October 7, 1959, in Mexico City, Mexico, the youngest son of Juan Alvarado Ibarra, better known as professional wrestler Shadito Cruz. Growing up Jesús Alvarado often had to look after his younger brothers, especially when his father was touring Mexico, wrestling several days a week. In a 1991 interview, he recalled how he did not have time to play with other boys, as he was watching over all the Alvarado kids while both his father and mother had to work to make ends meet. At one point he began taking his younger brothers Juan and Pepe to the local wrestling arenas where they sold old wrestling magazines and worked as ushers for tips. Jesús Alvarado began training for a professional wrestling career while still a teenager, despite the misgivings of his father. Local promoter and trainer Felipe Ham Lee began training Alavardo and helped convince his father to let his oldest son train for a wrestling career. When his son was ready to make his in-ring debut Shadito Cruz allowed him to use one of Cruz' old ring names "El Hombre de Brazo de Oro" ("The man with the golden arm"), based on a movie starring Frank Sinatra, but the younger Alvarado soon shortened to simply "Brazo de Oro".

Pro wrestling career
Alvarado made his debut as "Brazo de Oro" an enmascarado (masked wrestler) who worked mainly in tag team action with his brother who worked as Brazo de Plata ("Silver Arm") and in trios action with another brother known simply as El Brazo ("the arm"). Los Brazos, as they were billed, wrestled all over Mexico and made appearances for the Los Angeles-based "NWA Hollywood Wrestling". While working for NWA Hollywood Oro and Plata won the NWA Americas Tag Team Championship from Chino Chou and the Kiss on November 7, 1981. The brothers were also last holders of the Los Angeles version of the NWA World Tag Team Championship in 1982.

Losing the masks
Over the years Brazo de Oro and his brothers competed in a large number of Luchas de Apuestas ("Bet fights") where they put their masks or hair on the line against their opponents. Los Brazo's most famous Luchas de Apuestas occurred on October 21, 1988, when Plata, Oro and El Brazo all placed their masks on the line in a match against another well known Lucha libre family, Los Villanos, in this case Villano I, Villano IV and Villano V. The match was the culmination of a long feud (Storyline) between the two families and saw all six wrestlers bleed profusely during the bout. In the end Los Villanos won the match forcing all three Brazos to unmask and reveal their real names as is tradition in these types of matches. Despite losing their masks Los Brazos remained successful in the ring winning various tag team and trios titles such as the UWA World Tag Team Championship, UWA World Trios Championship, WWA World Tag Team Championship and the WWA World Trios Championship

By the 1990s Los Brazos worked mainly for Consejo Mundial de Lucha Libre (CMLL) where Oro, Plato and El Brazo won the CMLL World Trios Championship from Los Infernales (Pirata Morgan, El Satánico and MS-1) on April 6, 1993. Los Brazos lost the title to Dr. Wagner Jr., Gran Markus Jr. and El Hijo del Gladiador. In the 1990s Brazo de Oro became the head of the wrestler's union, and also worked as a booker for CMLL. From that point on he only wrestled occasionally, on smaller CMLL shows outside of Mexico. In 2006 he announced his retirement, but ended up working select dates and matches until 2015 where he had his last known match.

Personal life

The Alvarado wrestling family spans three generations starting with Shadito Cruz followed by his 6 sons who all took up wrestling, as well as a third-generation of Alvarados who followed in their father or grandfather's footsteps. Jesús Alvarado's younger brothers all adopted a variation of the "Brazo" name that he had made popular, as the began wrestling as El Brazo ("The Arm"), Brazo de Plata ("Silver Arm"), Brazo Cibernético ("Cyborg Arm"), Brazo de Platino ("Platinum Arm") and Super Brazo (Super Arm). At least one of Jesús Alvarado's children followed in his footsteps as his son, Felipe de Jesús Alvarado Mendoza,  began his wrestling career under the name "Brazo de Oro Jr." He later changed his name and became better known as La Máscara when all of the then-active third-generation Alvarados stopped using the "Brazo" name and created their own independent characters. In 2013 his daughter made her in-ring debut under the name "Aramís", wearing a modified version of the Brazos mask.

Death
Alvarado was rushed to a Mexico City hospital in the early hours of April 28, 2017, due to respiratory problems. A few hours later he died of a heart attack.

Alvarado family tree
† = deceased

Championships and accomplishments
Consejo Mundial de Lucha Libre
CMLL World Trios Championship (1 time) – with Brazo de Plata and El Brazo
Mexican National Tag Team Championship (1 time) – with Brazo de Plata
Mexican National Trios Championship (2 times) – with Brazo de Plata and El Brazo
Federación Internacional de Lucha Libre
FILL Trios Championship (1 time) – with Brazo de Plata and El Brazo
NWA Hollywood Wrestling
NWA Americas Tag Team Championship (1 time) – with Brazo de Plata
NWA World Tag Team Championship (Los Angeles version) (1 time) – with Brazo de Plata
Universal Wrestling Association
UWA World Tag Team Championship (1 time) – with Brazo de Plata
UWA World Trios Championship (3 times) – with Brazo de Plata and El Brazo
World Wrestling Association
WWA World Tag Team Championship (1 time) – with Brazo de Plata
WWA World Trios Championship (1 time) – with Brazo de Plata and El Brazo
Wrestling Observer Newsletter
Wrestling Observer Newsletter Hall of Fame (Class of 2021) as part of Los Brazos
Mexican regional wrestling
Distrito Federal Trios Championship (1 time) – with Brazo de Plata and El Brazo
Distrito Federal Welterweight Championship (1 time)
Distrito Federal Heavyweight Championship (1 time)
Puebla Tag Team Championship (1 time) – with Brazo de Plata
Mexico State Welterweight Championship (1 time)
Naucalpan Welterweight Championship (1 time)

Lucha de Apuesta record

Notes

References

1959 births
2017 deaths
20th-century professional wrestlers
21st-century professional wrestlers
Mexican male professional wrestlers
Masked wrestlers
Professional wrestlers from Mexico City
Alvarado wrestling family
Mexican National Tag Team Champions
Mexican National Trios Champions
CMLL World Trios Champions
UWA World Trios Champions
UWA World Tag Team Champions
NWA Americas Tag Team Champions